Oțelul have appointed Dumitru Dumitriu as their new manager after Vasile Simionaş left the team in early June.

Competitions

Divizia A

League table

Results by round

Results summary

Matches

Cupa României

Players

Transfers

In

Out

See also

 1999–2000 Divizia A
 1999–2000 Cupa României

References

External links
 The Rec.Sport.Soccer Statistics Foundation at rsssf.com

ASC Oțelul Galați seasons
Oțelul, Galați, ACS